Magdeleine Goüin, countess Bernard de Ganay (2 March 1901 – 30 June 1949) was a French racing driver and philanthropist.

Early life
Goüin was born 2 March 1901 in the 8th arrondissement of Paris. She was a daughter of Édouard Goüin and Suzanne du Buit (future countess of Segur-Lamoignon), as well as the sister of Henry Goüin, president of the Fondation Royaumont.

Career
As a racing driver, Goüin won the Rallye Paris - Saint-Raphaël Féminin in 1930 at the wheel of a Renault Reinastella type RM, then she finished second the following year at the Rally Paris-Amsterdam behind Suzanne Deutsch de La Meurthe.

She became vice-president of the Automobile-Club Feminine de France, then presided over by Anne de Rochechouart de Mortemart.

Philanthropy
Very involved in charitable and philanthropic works, Goüin creates and animates the "tea Rosy", teas of charity  of which the important funds harvested were donated for the benefit of the Work of Visiting Nurses of France, founded by her mother-in-law the Marquise de Ganay, or the dispensary of the Nelly-Martyl Foundation of the rue de Belleville.

Personal life
In 1919, she married Count Bernard de Ganay, president of polos de France, son of the Marquis Jean de Ganay and Berthe de Béhague and grandson of Etienne, Marquis de Ganay.

She died on 30 June 1949 in Casablanca, Morocco.

Descendants
They were notably the grandparents of Thierry and Christine de Ganay, wife of Pal Sarkozy (thus great-grandparents of Olivier Sarkozy), then of Frank G. Wisner.

References 

1901 births
1949 deaths
Racing drivers from Paris
French racing drivers
French female racing drivers
French philanthropists
20th-century philanthropists
20th-century French women